This is a list of prepared-foods list articles on Wikipedia.

Lists of prepared foods

 List of almond dishes
 List of ancient dishes
 List of avocado dishes
 List of bacon substitutes
 List of baked goods
 List of bean-to-bar chocolate manufacturers
 List of breakfast drinks
 List of breakfast cereals
 List of breakfast foods
 List of cabbage dishes
 List of cakes
 List of candies
 List of carrot dishes
 List of casserole dishes
 List of cheeses
List of brined cheeses
 List of chickpea dishes
 List of chocolate bar brands
 List of chocolate-covered foods
 List of Christmas dishes
 List of coconut dishes
 List of condiments
 List of brand name condiments
 List of confectionery
 List of confectionery brands
 List of dishes using coconut milk
 List of coffee dishes
 List of common dips
 List of custard desserts
 List of cookies
 List of dairy products
 List of deep fried foods
 List of desserts
 List of doughnut varieties
 List of dried foods
 List of dumplings
 List of egg dishes
 List of eggplant dishes
  List of fast foods
 List of fermented foods
 List of fermented soy products
 List of fish sauces
 List of food pastes
 List of foods made from maple
 List of fried dough foods
 List of fruit dishes
 List of goat dishes
 List of halal and kosher fish
 List of hors d'oeuvre
 List of hot dogs
 List of kebabs
 List of kosher foods
 List of legume dishes
 List of lemon dishes and drinks
 List of maize dishes
 List of meat substitutes
 List of military food topics
 List of mushroom dishes
 List of noodles
 List of noodle dishes
 List of pancakes
 List of pasta
 List of pastries
 List of pickled foods
 List of pies, tarts and flans
 List of poppy seed pastries and dishes
 List of porridges
 List of potato dishes
 List of puddings
 List of rice dishes
 List of rolled foods
 List of salads
 List of sandwiches
 List of American sandwiches
 List of sauces
 List of snack foods by country
 List of snack foods
 List of soul foods and dishes
 List of soups
 List of cheese soups
 List of soy-based foods
 List of spreads
 List of stews
 List of street food
 List of stuffed dishes
 List of syrups
 List of tapas
 List of tomato dishes
 List of twice-baked foods
 List of vegetable dishes
 List of yogurt-based dishes and beverages

Breads
 List of breads
 List of American breads
 List of brand name breads
 List of bread rolls
 List of buns
 List of British breads
 List of Indian breads
 List of sweet breads
 List of Pakistani breads
 List of quick breads
 List of sourdough breads
 List of bread dishes
 List of toast dishes

Meat dishes
 List of meat dishes
 List of bacon dishes
 List of beef dishes
 List of steak dishes
 List of hamburgers
 List of pork dishes
 List of sausages
 List of sausage dishes
 List of veal dishes
 List of chicken dishes

Fish and seafood dishes
 List of fish dishes
 List of raw fish dishes
 List of seafood dishes
 List of shrimp dishes

See also
 List of foods
 List of lists